Gamhariya  (formerly known as Gamhariya Gardaul) is a Village Development Committee in Sarlahi District in the Janakpur Zone of south-eastern Nepal. At the time of the 2011 Nepal census it had a population of 8,000 people residing in 674 individual households. 
It has two sub villages small Palsi which is hardly 1 km east of the village and other is called Ganesiya which is located at south of the village which is also 1 km. North Ganesiya is associate with Gamhariya identified by ward no 6 and south part is located in Musaili VDC.

Total population of the village has 8,000 as per 2011 census where male 4,400 and female 3,600.  Ratio of the VDC is 60% farmers, 20% business men and rest of the population is professional.  Yearly GDP of VDC is 12% and this is one of the developed and successful VDC of Sarlahi compare to other VDCs which is located at 2 km from headquarters Malangwa, Sarlahi.

Neighboring Villages 
Gamhariya is neighbourhood of Malangwa Municipality which is hardly 2 km far in south.  In north Salempur village development committee distance 2.5 km.  Similarly in north-east Brahampuri distance 3 km and south-east Bhelhi is located with same distance.  Aurahi and Sagardina have same distance 2.5 km located in west and north-west accordingly.  At last Motipur is South-west which 3 km from Gamhariya.

Malangwa - 11, Ward Chairman & Members
 Swambhu Yadav, Ward Chairman
 Member1, Malangwa, Ward No - 11
 Member2, Malangwa, Ward No - 11
 Member3, Malangwa, Ward No - 11
 Member4, Malangwa, Ward No - 11

Malangwa - 12, Ward Chairman & Members
 Ramdaresh Ray, Ward Chairman
 Member1, Malangwa, Ward No - 12
 Member2, Malangwa, Ward No - 12
 Member3, Malangwa, Ward No - 12
 Member4, Malangwa, Ward No - 12

Education System

 Shree Mati Laxmi Devi Janta Secondary High School, Gamhariya-1

 Shree Dinesh Sahid School

 Samudayik School

 Primary School

 Ant Boarding School

 Model Boarding School

Road

Agriculture

Geography

Temples

 Sitaram Temples

 Braham Maharaj

 Maharani Mai

 Chameli Mai

History
 Late. Basdev Ray

 Late. Deva Ray

 Late. Devsharan Ray

 Late. Hari Thakur

 Late. Jaleshwar Thakur

 Late. Jugal Ray

 Late. Laxmi Mahato

 Late. Pradip Singh

 Late. Radhe Ray

 Late. Ram Adhin Ray

 Late. Ram Bali Singh

 Late. Saryug Mahato

 Late. Sikari Ray

References

External links
UN map of the municipalities of Sarlahi  District
malangwa.com
Gamhariya Ward No 11 and 12

Demographics

Populated places in Sarlahi District